"Father and Son Game" is the thirtieth episode of the third season (1988–89) of the television series The Twilight Zone. In this episode, a man tries to have his father declared legally dead after his brain is replaced by an artificial implant. This is the last episode of the series.

Plot
At 79 years old, Darius Stephens is brain dead, but with the consent of his wife Anita, his brain has been surgically replaced with an experimental implant containing his digitized brain data. Darius's son (and Anita's stepson) Michael strongly disapproves. He has already accepted his father's death and thinks that a being who has had 60% of his body replaced by robotic parts and no longer even has an organic brain cannot be considered human.

Darius goes back to running his multi-million dollar corporation, despite his doctor's advice that he should take it easy following the surgery. Michael files a lawsuit invoking his succession as head of the company, arguing that Darius Stephens is dead; because brain transplants are new, brain death is still the undisputed indicator of legal death.

Disregarding advice for rest from both his lawyer and Anita, Darius insists on not only continuing to run the company but doing all the research and legwork on the case, boasting of how his robotic brain can accomplish things three times as fast as any human. After Darius starts stuttering and repeating words, Anita suggests he let go of the legal battle and allow Michael to run the company, but he says the fight is a matter of principle, and persists until he collapses from a brain malfunction. Darius is rushed to the hospital, but doctors are unable to effectively treat or even identify his ailment. He is declared dead.

Anita finds a computer disc in Darius' office to be viewed by her upon his death. She puts it into a computer and Darius appears on the monitor. He tells her he anticipated the experimental implant might have problems and backed up his intelligence to disk. He gives her directions to legally establish that he is alive in order to regain control of the company.

See also
Life extension

External links
 

1989 American television episodes
The Twilight Zone (1985 TV series season 3) episodes
American television series finales

fr:Lutte de générations